Brian Lane Green (born March 9, 1962) is an American stage and television actor and singer. He is known for his stage roles throughout the country such as the title character in Joseph and the Amazing Technicolor Dreamcoat. Green garnered a Tony Award nomination for his performance in the 1989 Broadway production of Starmites. He also appeared as JoJo in The Life on Broadway.

Biography
Green was born in Columbus, Indiana and grew up in Cleveland, Tennessee, where he began singing in church. He won the Church of God national Teen Talent competition. After starring in a local production of Pippin, he began working as an actor, guest starring on television shows such as Highway to Heaven, Hotel, Matlock and Murder, She Wrote; and as a regular on the soap operas Days of Our Lives, Another World, and All My Children. In 1986, he made his Broadway debut in the role of Huck Finn in Big River. He appears in the 2001 gay-related film Circuit.

Green collaborated with Billy Stritch and Johnny Rodgers to write, I Would Never Leave You for Liza Minnelli. The song appeared in Liza's at the Palace...! on Broadway and can be heard on the album of the show, produced by Phil Ramone.

Most recently, he has appeared in The Broadway Tenors concerts.

Green currently serves on the Artistic Advisory Board of Gulfshore Playhouse, Southwest Florida's premier professional theatre.

Filmography

Personal life
In 2003, Green came out as gay to Out magazine.

References

External links

"THE LEADING MEN: Gavin's Havin' a Ball" at Playbill

1962 births
Male actors from Indiana
American male musical theatre actors
Living people
American gay actors
21st-century LGBT people